Appalachignathus is a genus of multielement conodonts from the Middle Ordovician of North America.

The elements of Appalachignathus are amongst the first occurrences of the Ozarkodina-type feeding apparatuses.

References

External links 

 
 

Prioniodontida genera
Ordovician fish of North America
Ordovician conodonts
Paleozoic life of the Northwest Territories